Edward P. Foley (March 10, 1891 – October 17, 1980) was a pharmacist and political figure on Prince Edward Island. He represented 5th Prince in the Legislative Assembly of Prince Edward Island from 1935 to 1943, and from 1951 to 1959 as a Liberal.

He was born in Kildare, Prince Edward Island, the son of Patrick Foley. Foley was educated at Prince of Wales College and became a pharmacist in Summerside. He served as a member of the local Board of Trade. Foley was married twice: to Helen Noonan in 1925, then later to Margaret Tierney. He served as speaker in 1939, and in 1943 defeated when he ran for reelection. He was a minister without portfolio in the province's Executive Council from 1954 to 1958. Foley died in Summerside at the age of 89.

References 
 

Speakers of the Legislative Assembly of Prince Edward Island
Prince Edward Island Liberal Party MLAs
1891 births
1980 deaths
People from Prince County, Prince Edward Island